Da Real World is the second studio album by American rapper Missy "Misdemeanor" Elliott, released on June 22, 1999, by Elektra and The Goldmind. The album is noted for adding a raunchier and darker style to Elliott's music, as well as including the overt political use of the term "bitch". The album features guest appearances from B.G., Juvenile, Lil' Mo, Nicole, Beyoncé, Eve, Eminem, Lady Saw, Da Brat, Aaliyah, Big Boi of Outkast, Lil' Kim, MC Solaar, and Redman.

The album debuted at number ten on the US Billboard 200 chart. The album was certified platinum by the Recording Industry Association of America (RIAA). It spawned the singles "She's a Bitch", "All N My Grill", and "Hot Boyz (Remix)".

Background
Originally titled She's a Bitch, Elliott commented on the choice for the title as a positive way of expressing herself as a "strong woman in power"; she also stated that she felt very pressured while recording this album, and explained that she was afraid of experiencing a sophomore slump. Elliott dedicated the album to the victims of the Columbine High School massacre.

Singles
On March 4, 1999, "She's a Bitch" was sent to local radio stations in the United States as the lead single for the album. Elliott went on to release two additional singles: "All N My Grill" and "Hot Boyz (Remix)", featuring Eve, Nas, and Lil' Mo.

Critical reception

Da Real World received critical acclaim from music critics. Keith Farley of AllMusic declared it an "excellent follow-up" and added that "it's clearly a Missy Elliott album in most respects, with Timbaland's previously trademarked, futuristic-breakbeat production smarts laced throughout." Entertainment Weekly felt that "Da Real World marks steps in several right directions — both for rap and for understanding the never-ending battle of the sexes."

Touré of Rolling Stone compared the album to George Lucas's epic space opera Star Wars: Episode I – The Phantom Menace (1999) and wrote: "Da Real World is much-anticipated and futuristic, with a hype that outstrips the reality. The concept is more interesting than the execution." He added that "even if Da Real World isn't a successful one, the album, somewhat, recalls Queen Latifah."

Commercial performance
Da Real World debuted at number ten on the US Billboard 200 chart, becoming Elliott's second top-ten debut and staying on the chart for a total of 39 weeks. On February 4, 2000, the album was certified platinum by the Recording Industry Association of America (RIAA) for sales of over a million copies in the United States. As of November 2015, the album has sold 1,068,000 copies in the US.

Track listing 
All songs produced by Timbaland.  Credits adapted from the album's liner notes.

Sample credits
 "Busa Rhyme" contains an interpolation of "Play That Funky Music", written by Rob Parissi.
 "Dangerous Mouths" contains an interpolation of "I Wonder If I Take You Home", written by Curt Bedeau, Gerry Charles, Hugh L Clarke, Brian George, Lucien George, Paul George.

Charts

Weekly charts

Year-end charts

Certifications

Release history

See also
 List of number-one R&B albums of 1999 (U.S.)

References

External links
 

1999 albums
Albums produced by Timbaland
Missy Elliott albums
Elektra Records albums
The Goldmind Inc. albums